Dowruhan-e Jalil (also Romanized as Dowrūhān-e Jalīl; also known as Dowrūhān) is a village in Sepidar Rural District, in the Central District of Boyer-Ahmad County, Kohgiluyeh and Boyer-Ahmad Province, Iran. At the 2006 census, its population was 140, in 25 families.

References 

Populated places in Boyer-Ahmad County